Baandi is a Pakistani television serial directed by Syed Ahmed Kamran and written by Asma Nabeel. It started to air from 9 September 2018 on Hum TV. It has Aiman Khan and Muneeb Butt in leads.

Plot summary 
Set in the backdrop of the rural areas of Sindh, Bandi revolves around the daughter of a poor farmer, Meeru whose parents hired her as a maid for a rich family with the help of a woman in an attempt to save her from a rogue landlord of their village as her father is debtor of the landlord. Meeru's life takes a turn when the owner's son, Wali Ali Khan who is a police man falls for her.

Cast 
 Aiman Khan as Meeru
 Muneeb Butt as Wali Ali Khan
 Yasir Hussain as Tahawaar
 Hina Dilpazeer as Faiza Begum
 Noman Masood as Ali Faizan
 Hajra Yamin as Rameen
 Kamran Jillani as Aadi
 Daniyal Raheal as Farhan
 Alizeh Shah as Bakto
 Kinza Malik as Farhan's mother	
 Khawaja Saleem as Babu Bahi
 Azeem Sajjad as Meeru's father

Production 
The serial has been written by Asma Nabeel who has 2017 hit serial Khaani in her credit and directed by Ahmad Kamran who previously directed acclaimed serials Mohabbat Aag Si and Zun Mureed for Hum TV. Aiman Khan and Muneeb Butt are finalised for lead roles while Yasir Hussain as antagonist. Hina Dilpazeer will also be seen in a vital character. Speaking about the series, Yasir revealed to instep. "There are multiple tracks in the play", he further said, "One of them features Aiman and my character; and we both come from the same village, of which I am the wadera".

It was the sixth project featuring real life couple Butt and Khan together after Bay Qasoor (2015), Googly Muhalla (2015), Khatoon Manzil (2015), Khwab Saraye (2016) and Zindaan (2017).

Soundtrack 

The title song was sung by Sahir Ali Bagga and Beena Khan. The music was composed by Sahir Ali Bagga and the lyrics were written by Asma Nabeel.

Accolades

See also 
 List of programs broadcast by Hum TV

References

External links 
 Official Website

2018 Pakistani television series debuts
Pakistani drama television series
Urdu-language television shows
Hum TV original programming
Hum TV